WCW Wrestling (a.k.a. World Championship Wrestling) is a Nintendo Entertainment System professional wrestling video game that was originally released in Japan in 1989 under the name Super Star Pro Wrestling, with a different lineup of wrestlers. It was later released in North America in 1990 with a more familiar lineup of wrestlers.

It was the first (and, to date, only) video game based on the National Wrestling Alliance (at the time, WCW was a member of NWA). After The Road Warriors left WCW for the World Wrestling Federation (WWF), WCW continued to advertise the game in their own catalogs with a mock-up cartridge showing Sting on the label, though no such copies of the game with an alternate label are known to exist or believed to have ever been manufactured. To date, the game has sold over 100,000 copies.

Gameplay
Each wrestler in WCW Wrestling has eight "selectable" moves, two Irish whip moves, and a finisher.

Selectable moveset
WCW Wrestling differs from most wrestling titles in that the players select their wrestler's moveset prior to the match. Each wrestler has a menu of eight moves (with each wrestler featuring a unique moveset), from which players choose four (each move selected is assigned to a direction on the D-pad).

Playable wrestlers and final opponent 
Playable wrestlers in the game are Ric Flair, Sting, Lex Luger, Mike Rotundo, Road Warrior Hawk, Road Warrior Animal, Steve Williams, Kevin Sullivan, Ricky Steamboat, Rick Steiner, Eddie Gilbert, Michael Hayes, and the opponent who is wrestled at the end of the game is a masked wrestler named the WCW master.

Irish whip moves
These moves are performed by first initiating an Irish whip (throwing the opponent into the ropes by pressing left and B or right and B) and then pressing either A or B when the opponent is near. Each wrestler has a different Irish whip moveset (though these moves are not selectable in the moveset menu).

Finishers
Each wrestler has his own finisher move. These must be performed in the middle of the ring and can only be accomplished when the opponent had two squares remaining on his health meter. The move is performed by pressing A and B simultaneously.  Finishers deliver significantly more damage than a regular move and are likely to end the match in a knock-out or submission.

Super Star Pro Wrestling

Super Star Pro Wrestling is a 1989 Japanese professional wrestling, or puroresu, game made by Nihon Bussan and published by Pony Canyon for the Nintendo Famicom system. Released December 9, 1989, the game features play for both one- and two-player modes. It was released a year later in the United States as WCW Wrestling on the Nintendo Entertainment System, with different wrestlers.

The game featured a different roster with wrestlers well-known in Japan's AJPW and NJPW promotions. It featured Antonio Inoki, Giant Baba, Jumbo Tsuruta, Genichiro Tenryu, Riki Chosu, Akira Maeda, Bruiser Brody, Stan Hansen, Big Van Vader, Abdullah the Butcher, Road Warrior Hawk & Animal, and Andre the Giant under his Giant Machine gimmick.
Below is a list of which WCW Wrestlers took the place of the original Super Star Pro Wrestling roster.
        
 Lex Luger is based on Antonio Inoki
 Ric Flair is based on Giant Baba
 Mike Rotunda is based on Jumbo Tsuruta
 Kevin Sullivan is based on Genichiro Tenryu
 Sting is based on Riki Choshu
 Rick Steiner is based on Akira Maeda
 Ricky Steamboat is based on Bruiser Brody
 Road Warrior Hawk is based on Stan Hansen (even though he is in both versions, the WCW Wrestling version of Hawk is not based on the Super Star Pro Wrestling version. This is why the US version uses Hansen's trademark Western Lariat as a finisher in the game)
 Michael P.S. Hayes is based on Road Warrior Hawk
 "Dr Death" Steve Williams is based on Big Van Vader
 Eddie Gilbert is based on Abdullah the Butcher
 Road Warrior Animal is the only one who remains unchanged. 
 WCW Master is based on André the Giant, who also appears as the boss of Super Star Pro Wrestling. His mask is reminiscent of André's "Giant Machine" gimmick.

There are some inaccuracies in the game, mainly with the birthdates of some wrestlers, and Big Van Vader's hometown and date of birth are not listed in order to protect his gimmick.

Other games
WCW Wrestling was the working title for at least two other WCW games. One was a canceled game for the game.com handheld system. The other was a sequel to Electronic Arts' WCW Mayhem, intended for release on the PlayStation 2 platform (the game was later renamed WCW Mayhem 2, and eventually canceled when WCW was sold to the WWF).

See also

List of licensed wrestling video games

References

External links
A Japanese review for Superstar Pro Wrestling, the basis for WCW Wrestling
WCW Wrestling at GameFAQs

1989 video games
Multiplayer and single-player video games
Nintendo Entertainment System games
Nintendo Entertainment System-only games
Professional wrestling games
Video games developed in Japan
World Championship Wrestling video games